Island Innovation Sixth Form Campus (or Island Innovation VI Form Campus) is a joint provision Sixth Form Center between Carisbrooke College and Medina College on the Isle of Wight. It is controlled by the Island Innovation Trust. It is located in the building previously occupied by Nodehill Middle School; the main building dates from 1904 and was originally built as the Seely Library and Technical Institute. 

Official lessons began on 12/09/2011.

The Isle of Wight County Press reported on 09/09/2011 that the building work was behind schedule. This was subsequently denied by Island Innovation Trust.

Notes

Education on the Isle of Wight